The Hongkou Dam is a concrete gravity dam on the Huotong River located  northwest of Ningde in Fujian Province, China. Constructed between 2003 and 2008, the dam serves to produce hydroelectricity. Its power station consists of two 100 MW Francis turbine-generators for an installed capacity of 200 MW.

See also

List of dams and reservoirs in China
List of major power stations in Fujian

References

Dams in China
Hydroelectric power stations in Fujian
Gravity dams
Dams completed in 2008
Roller-compacted concrete dams